Spur of the Moment may refer to:
 "Spur of the Moment" (The Twilight Zone), an episode of the American television anthology series The Twilight Zone
 Spur of the Moment (album), a 1988 album by Peter Hammill and Guy Evans
 Spur of the Moment (film), a 1931 Australian film directed by A.R. Harwood
 Spur of the Moment (play), a 2010 play by Anya Reiss